On-board scales are devices for determining the approximate loaded weight of a truck. For many types of trucks, knowing the loaded weight is important for operating safely and maximising payload whilst avoiding fines for overloading. On-board scales use either load cell technology or pressure readings from air suspension to calculate the weight on the vehicle axles. Operating the truck at its optimal payload ensures that the owner minimises his running costs whilst maximising his profit.

The convenience of being able to weigh at the loading site is a key factor in the popularity of on-board scales. This ability eliminates the costs associated with using an in-ground scale, such as lost hours of service, scale fees, and driver wages.

Types
There are four types of on-board scales in use:

Load-cell scales
Load-cell scales are based on electronic load cell transducers, and can be mechanical or strain-gauge. There is a wide variety of scale types that can be built with load cell technology. Typically load cells are used in payload scales for vehicles with spring suspension.

Air-suspension PSI gauges
Air-suspension PSI gauges are used on commercial trucks and semi-trailers where accurate weights are not as critical.

Air-suspension load scales
Load scales for air-ride applications that show on-the-ground weight in pounds (LBS) or kilograms (KG) instead of standard PSI. These non-electric gauges are analog (dial-face) with versions that can calibrate for accuracy.

Electronic scales with PSI sensors
Electronic scales with PSI sensors measure temperature and pressure changes in a vehicle's air suspension. It relays this data to a receiver hardwired into the cab, or wirelessly to a handheld unit, which interprets the data and displays an approximate axle weight or gross vehicle weight.

Wheel Loader Weighing

References 

 MOBA Onboard scale for garbage trucks

Weighing instruments